Gianluca Sampietro (born 15 March 1993) is an Italian footballer who plays for Messina.

Biography
Born in Genoa, Liguria region, Sampietro started his career at one of the two Serie A club of the city — U.C. Sampdoria. In summer 2012 Sampietro was no longer eligible to the reserve as underage player, as the rule had changed from U20 to U19 event, thus, born 1992 and 1993 players were left the reserve at the same time. On 31 August 2012 Sampietro joined Portogruaro along with Simone Patacchiola. The club also loaned several players from Sampdoria. Sampietro made his debut in the second round of 2012–13 Lega Pro Prima Divisione. (Portogruaro did not have a fixture in round 1 due to 17 teams in Group A of the division).

On 8 July 2013 he left for A.C. Pisa 1909 of Lega Pro Prima Divisione in a temporary deal. On 1 September 2014 he was signed by U.S. Ancona 1905.

On 15 September 2015 Sampietro was signed by Pro Patria in a temporary deal.

On 20 July 2019, he joined Serie D club Messina.

References

External links
 FIGC 
 

Italian footballers
U.C. Sampdoria players
A.S.D. Portogruaro players
A.S. Gubbio 1910 players
A.C. Gozzano players
Pisa S.C. players
U.S. Ancona 1905 players
Aurora Pro Patria 1919 players
Taranto F.C. 1927 players
A.C.R. Messina players
Serie C players
Serie D players
Association football midfielders
Italy youth international footballers
Footballers from Genoa
1993 births
Living people